Na'amat  is an Israeli and international  women's organization affiliated with the Labour Zionist Movement. Na'amat was founded in 1921.

Etymology
Na'amat is an acronym for Nashim Ovdot U'Mitnadvot, lit. "Working and Volunteering Women."

History
Na'amat is the largest women's movement in Israel. It has a membership of 800,000 women, (Jews, Arabs, Druze and Circassians) representing the entire spectrum of Israel society. Most are volunteers.
The organization has 100 branches in cities, towns and settlements all over the country. It also has sister organizations in other countries whose members are part of the World Labour Zionist Movement and the World Zionist Organization. The American branch was founded in 1926; it was first called Pioneer Women of Palestine, and then renamed Pioneer Women in 1939, and in 1981 it was renamed again to Na'amat.

In 2008, Na'amat, together with two other women's organizations, received the Israel Prize for lifetime achievement and special contribution to society and the State of Israel.

References

See also 
List of Israel Prize recipients
Haifa Women's Coalition

Histadrut
Zionist organizations
Women's organizations based in Israel
Israel Prize recipients that are organizations
Israel Prize for lifetime achievement & special contribution to society recipients
Organizations established in 1921